Covedale is a census-designated place (CDP) in Green Township, Hamilton County, Ohio, United States. The population was 6,472 at the 2020 census. The CDP represents the part of the former village of Covedale that was not annexed by the city of Cincinnati in the 1890s.

Geography
Covedale is located at  (39.126113, -84.627964).

Demographics

At the 2000 census there were 6,360 people, 2,432 households, and 1,826 families in the CDP.  The population density was 2,274.3 people per square mile (877.0/km).  There were 2,505 housing units at an average density of 895.8/sq mi (345.4/km).  The racial makup of the CDP was 98.58% White, 0.35% African American, 0.13% Native American, 0.31% Asian, 0.20% from other races, and 0.42% from two or more races. Hispanic or Latino of any race were 0.64%.

Of the 2,432 households 30.7% had children under the age of 18 living with them, 64.8% were married couples living together, 7.9% had a female householder with no husband present, and 24.9% were non-families. 22.5% of households were one person and 12.2% were one person aged 65 or older.  The average household size was 2.61 and the average family size was 3.08.

The age distribution was 25.3% under the age of 18, 6.4% from 18 to 24, 25.5% from 25 to 44, 23.7% from 45 to 64, and 19.1% 65 or older.  The median age was 40 years. For every 100 females, there were 93.0 males.  For every 100 females age 18 and over, there were 88.3 males.

The median household income was $57,016 and the median family income  was $65,456. Males had a median income of $40,697 versus $32,182 for females. The per capita income for the CDP was $28,845.  About 0.8% of families and 1.9% of the population were below the poverty line, including 3.1% of those under age 18 and 0.4% of those age 65 or over.

References

Census-designated places in Hamilton County, Ohio
Census-designated places in Ohio